The French Revolution was a period of radical political and societal change in France that began with the Estates General of 1789 and ended with the formation of the French Consulate in November 1799. Many of its ideas are considered fundamental principles of liberal democracy, while the values and institutions it created remain central to French political discourse.

Its causes are generally agreed to be a combination of social, political and economic factors, which the Ancien Régime proved unable to manage. In May 1789, widespread social distress led to the convocation of the Estates General, which was converted into a National Assembly in June. Continuing unrest culminated in the Storming of the Bastille on 14 July, which led to a series of radical measures by the Assembly, including the abolition of feudalism, the imposition of state control over the Catholic Church in France, and extension of the right to vote.

The next three years were dominated by the struggle for political control, exacerbated by economic depression and civil disorder. Austria, Britain, Prussia and other external powers sought to restore the Ancien Régime by force, while many French politicians saw war as the best way to unite the nation and preserve the revolution by exporting it to other countries. These factors resulted in the outbreak of the French Revolutionary Wars in April 1792, abolition of the French monarchy and proclamation of the French First Republic in September 1792, followed by the execution of Louis XVI in January 1793.

The Paris-based Insurrection of 31 May – 2 June 1793 replaced the Girondins who dominated the National Assembly with the Committee of Public Safety, headed by Maximilien Robespierre. Attempts to eliminate his opponents sparked the Reign of Terror, with an estimated 16,000 killed by the time it ended in July 1794. As well as external enemies, the Republic faced internal opposition from both Royalists and Jacobins and in order to deal with these threats, the French Directory took power in November 1795. Despite a series of military victories, many won by Napoleon Bonaparte, political divisions and economic stagnation resulted in the Directory being replaced by the Consulate in November 1799. This is generally seen as marking the end of the Revolutionary period.

Causes 
The underlying causes of the French Revolution are usually attributed to the Ancien Régime's failure to manage social and economic inequality. Rapid population growth and the inability to adequately finance government debt resulted in economic depression, unemployment and high food prices. Combined with a regressive tax system and resistance to reform by the ruling elite, it resulted in a crisis Louis XVI proved unable to manage.

At the same time, discussion of these issues and political dissent had become part of wider European society, rather than confined to a small elite. This took different forms, such as 'English coffeehouse culture', and extended to areas colonised by Europeans, particularly British North America. Contacts between diverse groups in Edinburgh, Geneva, Boston, Amsterdam, Paris, London, or Vienna were much greater than often appreciated.

Transnational elites who shared ideas and styles were not new; what changed was their extent and the numbers involved. Under King Louis XIV, the court at Versailles was the centre of culture, fashion and political power. Improvements in education and literacy over the course of the 18th century meant larger audiences for newspapers and journals, with Masonic lodges, coffee houses and reading clubs providing areas where people could debate and discuss ideas. The emergence of this "public sphere" led to Paris replacing Versailles as the cultural and intellectual centre, leaving the Court isolated and less able to influence opinion.

In addition to these social changes, the French population grew from 18 million in 1700 to 26 million in 1789, making it the most populous state in Europe; Paris had over 600,000 inhabitants, of whom roughly one third were either unemployed or had no regular work. Inefficient agricultural methods meant domestic farmers struggled to grow enough food to support these numbers and primitive transportation networks made it hard to distribute what they did produce. As a consequence of this imbalance, food prices rose by 65% between 1770 and 1790 but wages increased by only 22%. Such shortages were damaging for the regime, since many blamed price increases on government failure to prevent profiteering. Poor harvests throughout the 1780s, culminating in the most severe winter for decades in 1788/1789, created a rural peasantry with nothing to sell, and an urban proletariat whose purchasing power had collapsed.

The other major drag on the economy was state debt. Traditional views of the French Revolution often attribute the financial crisis to the costs of the 1778–1783 Anglo-French War, but modern economic studies show this is only a partial explanation. In 1788, the ratio of debt to gross national income in France was 55.6%, compared to 181.8% in Britain, and although French borrowing costs were higher, the percentage of revenue devoted to interest payments was roughly the same in both countries. One historian concludes "neither the level of French state debt in 1788, or its previous history, can be considered an explanation for the outbreak of revolution in 1789".

The problem lay in the assessment and collection of the taxes used to fund government expenditure. Rates varied widely from one region to another, often bore little or no relation to the amounts set out in official decrees, and were collected inconsistently. It was the complexity as much as the financial burden that caused resentment; complaints from the nobility were not affected by paying significantly less than other classes. Attempts to make the system more transparent were blocked by the regional Parlements which controlled financial policy. The resulting impasse in the face of widespread economic distress led to the calling of the Estates-General, which became radicalised by the struggle for control of public finances.

Although not indifferent to the crisis and willing to consider reforms, Louis XVI often backed down when faced with opposition from conservative elements within the nobility. As a result, the court became the target of popular anger, particularly Queen Marie-Antoinette, who was viewed as a spendthrift Austrian spy, and blamed for the dismissal of 'progressive' ministers like Jacques Necker. For their opponents, Enlightenment ideas on equality and democracy provided an intellectual framework for dealing with these issues, while the American Revolution was seen as confirmation of their practical application.

Crisis of the Ancien Régime

Financial crisis 

The French state faced a series of budgetary crises during the 18th century, caused primarily by structural deficiencies rather than lack of resources. Unlike Britain, where Parliament determined both expenditures and taxes, in France the Crown controlled spending, but not revenue. National taxes could only be approved by the Estates-General, which had not sat since 1614; its revenue functions had been assumed by regional parlements, the most powerful being the Parlement de Paris (see Map).

Although willing to authorise one-time taxes, these bodies were reluctant to pass long-term measures, while collection was outsourced to private individuals. This significantly reduced the yield from those that were approved and as a result, France struggled to service its debt despite being larger and wealthier than Britain. Following partial default in 1770, within five years the budget had been balanced thanks to reforms instituted by Turgot, the Controller-General of Finances. This reduced government borrowing costs from 12% per year to under 6%, but he was dismissed in May 1776 after arguing France could not afford to intervene in the American Revolutionary War.

Two ministers followed in quick succession before the Swiss banker Necker took over in July 1777. He was able to fund the war through loans rather than taxes, but his dire warnings about the impact on national finances led to his replacement in 1781 by Charles Alexandre de Calonne. Continued French intervention in America and the associated 1778 to 1783 Anglo-French War could only be funded by issuing substantial quantities of new state debt. This created a large rentier class who lived on the interest, primarily members of the French nobility or commercial classes. By 1785, the government was struggling to cover these payments; since defaulting on the debt would negatively impact much of French society, the only other option was to increase taxes. When the parlements refused to collect them, Calonne persuaded Louis to summon the Assembly of Notables, an advisory council dominated by the upper nobility. Led by de Brienne, a former archbishop of Toulouse, the council also refused to approve new taxes, arguing this could only be done by the Estates.

By 1788, total state debt had increased to an unprecedented 4.5 billion livres. De Brienne, who succeeded Calonne in May 1787, tried to address the budgetary impasse without raising taxes by devaluing the coinage instead; the result was runaway inflation, worsening the plight of the farmers and urban poor. In a last attempt to resolve the crisis, Necker returned as Finance Minister in August 1788 but was unable to reach an agreement on how to increase revenue. In May 1789, Louis summoned the Estates-General for the first time in over a hundred and fifty years.

Estates-General of 1789 

The Estates-General was divided into three parts: the First for members of the clergy; Second for the nobility; and Third for the "commons". Each sat separately, enabling the First and Second Estates to outvote the Third, despite representing less than 5% of the population, while both were largely exempt from tax.

In the 1789 elections, the First Estate returned 303 deputies, representing 100,000 Catholic clergy; nearly 10% of French lands were owned directly by individual bishops and monasteries, in addition to tithes paid by peasants. More than two-thirds of the clergy lived on less than 500 livres per year, and were often closer to the urban and rural poor than those elected for the Third Estate, where voting was restricted to male French taxpayers, aged 25 or over. As a result, half of the 610 deputies elected to the Third Estate in 1789 were lawyers or local officials, nearly a third businessmen, while fifty-one were wealthy land owners.

The Second Estate elected 291 deputies, representing about 400,000 men and women, who owned about 25% of the land and collected seigneurial dues and rents from their tenants. Like the clergy, this was not a uniform body, and was divided into the noblesse d'épée, or traditional aristocracy, and the noblesse de robe. The latter derived rank from judicial or administrative posts and tended to be hard-working professionals, who dominated the regional parlements and were often intensely socially conservative.

To assist delegates, each region completed a list of grievances, known as Cahiers de doléances. Although they contained ideas that would have seemed radical only months before, most supported the monarchy, and assumed the Estates-General would agree to financial reforms, rather than fundamental constitutional change. The lifting of press censorship allowed widespread distribution of political writings, mostly written by liberal members of the aristocracy and upper middle-class. Abbé Sieyès, a political theorist and priest elected to the Third Estate, argued it should take precedence over the other two as it represented 95% of the population.

The Estates-General convened in the Menus-Plaisirs du Roi on 5 May 1789, near the Palace of Versailles rather than in Paris; the choice of location was interpreted as an attempt to control their debates. As was customary, each Estate assembled in separate rooms, whose furnishings and opening ceremonies deliberately emphasised the superiority of the First and Second Estates. They also insisted on enforcing the rule that only those who owned land could sit as deputies for the Second Estate, and thus excluded the immensely popular Comte de Mirabeau.

As separate assemblies meant the Third Estate could always be outvoted by the other two, Sieyès sought to combine all three. His method was to require all deputies be approved by the Estates-General as a whole, instead of each Estate verifying its own members. Since this meant the legitimacy of deputies derived from the Estates-General, they would have to continue sitting as one body. After an extended stalemate, on 10 June the Third Estate proceeded to verify its own deputies, a process completed on 17 June; two days later, they were joined by over 100 members of the First Estate, and declared themselves the National Assembly. The remaining deputies from the other two Estates were invited to join, but the Assembly made it clear they intended to legislate with or without their support.

In an attempt to prevent the Assembly from convening, Louis XVI ordered the Salle des États closed down, claiming it needed to be prepared for a royal speech. On 20 June, the Assembly met in a tennis court outside Versailles and swore not to disperse until a new constitution had been agreed. Messages of support poured in from Paris and other cities; by 27 June, they had been joined by the majority of the First Estate, plus forty-seven members of the Second, and Louis backed down.

Constitutional monarchy (July 1789 – September 1792)

Abolition of the Ancien Régime 

Even these limited reforms went too far for Marie Antoinette and Louis' younger brother the Comte d'Artois; on their advice, Louis dismissed Necker again as chief minister on 11 July. On 12 July, the Assembly went into a non-stop session after rumours circulated he was planning to use the Swiss Guards to force it to close. The news brought crowds of protestors into the streets, and soldiers of the elite  regiment refused to disperse them.

On the 14th, many of these soldiers joined the mob in attacking the Bastille, a royal fortress with large stores of arms and ammunition. Its governor, Bernard-René de Launay, surrendered after several hours of fighting that cost the lives of 83 attackers. Although rumoured to hold many prisoners, the Bastille held only seven: four forgers, two noblemen held for "immoral behaviour", and a murder suspect. In French culture, some see its fall as the start of the Revolution.

Alarmed by the prospect of losing control of the capital, Louis appointed the Marquis de Lafayette commander of the National Guard, with Jean-Sylvain Bailly as head of a new administrative structure known as the Commune. On 17 July, Louis visited Paris accompanied by 100 deputies, where he was greeted by Bailly and accepted a tricolore cockade to loud cheers. However, it was clear power had shifted from his court; he was welcomed as 'Louis XVI, father of the French and king of a free people.'

The short-lived unity enforced on the Assembly by a common threat quickly dissipated. Deputies argued over constitutional forms, while civil authority rapidly deteriorated. On 22 July, former Finance Minister Joseph Foullon and his son were lynched by a Parisian mob, and neither Bailly nor Lafayette could prevent it. The breakdown of law and order and frequent attacks on aristocratic property led much of the nobility to flee abroad. These émigrés funded reactionary forces within France and urged foreign monarchs to back a counter-revolution.

In response, the Assembly published the August Decrees which abolished feudalism and other privileges held by the nobility, notably exemption from tax. Other decrees included equality before the law, opening public office to all, freedom of worship, and cancellation of special privileges held by provinces and towns. Over 25% of French farmland was subject to feudal dues, which provided most of the income for large landowners; these were now cancelled, along with tithes due to the church. The intention was for tenants to pay compensation for these losses but the majority refused to comply and the obligation was cancelled in 1793.

With the suspension of the 13 regional  in November, the key institutional pillars of the old regime had all been abolished in less than four months. From its early stages, the Revolution therefore displayed signs of its radical nature; what remained unclear was the constitutional mechanism for turning intentions into practical applications.

Creating a new constitution 
Assisted by Thomas Jefferson, then the minister to France, Lafayette prepared a draft constitution known as the Declaration of the Rights of Man and of the Citizen, which echoed some of the provisions of the Declaration of Independence. However France had reached no consensus on the role of the Crown, and until this question was settled, it was impossible to create political institutions. When presented to the legislative committee on 11 July, it was rejected by pragmatists such as Jean Joseph Mounier, President of the Assembly, who feared creating expectations that could not be satisfied.

After editing by Mirabeau, it was published on 26 August as a statement of principle. It contained provisions considered radical in any European society, let alone 1789 France, and while historians continue to debate responsibility for its wording, most agree the reality is a mix. Although Jefferson made major contributions to Lafayette's draft, he himself acknowledged an intellectual debt to Montesquieu, and the final version was significantly different. French historian Georges Lefebvre argues that combined with the elimination of privilege and feudalism, it "highlighted equality in a way the (American Declaration of Independence) did not".

More importantly, the two differed in intent; Jefferson saw the US Constitution and Bill of Rights as fixing the political system at a specific point in time, claiming they 'contained no original thought...but expressed the American mind' at that stage. The 1791 French Constitution was viewed as a starting point, the Declaration providing an aspirational vision, a key difference between the two Revolutions. Attached as a preamble to the French Constitution of 1791, and that of the 1870 to 1940 French Third Republic, it was incorporated into the current Constitution of France in 1958.

Discussions continued. Mounier, supported by conservatives like Gérard de Lally-Tollendal, wanted a bicameral system, with an upper house appointed by the king, who would have the right of veto. On 10 September, the majority led by Sieyès and Talleyrand rejected this in favour of a single assembly, while Louis retained only a "suspensive veto"; this meant he could delay the implementation of a law, but not block it. On this basis, a new committee was convened to agree on a constitution; the most controversial issue was citizenship, linked to the debate on the balance between individual rights and obligations. Ultimately, the 1791 Constitution distinguished between 'active citizens' who held political rights, defined as French males over the age of 25, who paid direct taxes equal to three days' labour, and 'passive citizens', who were restricted to 'civil rights'. As a result, it was never fully accepted by radicals in the Jacobin club.

This came to a head in late September, when the Flanders Regiment arrived in Versailles to reinforce the Royal Bodyguard and in line with normal practice were welcomed with a formal banquet. Popular anger was fuelled by press descriptions of this as a 'gluttonous orgy', and claims that the tricolor cockade had been abused. The arrival of these troops was also viewed as an attempt to intimidate the Assembly.

On 5 October 1789, crowds of women assembled outside the Hôtel de Ville, urging action to reduce prices and improve bread supplies. These protests quickly turned political, and after seizing weapons stored at the Hôtel de Ville, some 7,000 marched on Versailles, where they entered the Assembly to present their demands. They were followed by 15,000 members of the National Guard under Lafayette, who tried to dissuade them, but took command when it became clear they would desert if he did not grant their request.

When the National Guard arrived later that evening, Lafayette persuaded Louis that the safety of his family required their relocation to Paris. Next morning, some of the protestors broke into the Royal apartments, searching for Marie Antoinette, who escaped. They ransacked the palace, killing several guards. Although the situation remained tense, order was eventually restored, and the Royal family and Assembly left for Paris, escorted by the National Guard. Announcing his acceptance of the August Decrees and the Declaration, Louis committed to constitutional monarchy, and his official title changed from 'King of France' to 'King of the French'.

Revolution and the church 
Historian John McManners argues "in eighteenth-century France, throne and altar were commonly spoken of as in close alliance; their simultaneous collapse ... would one day provide the final proof of their interdependence." One suggestion is that after a century of persecution, some French Protestants actively supported an anti-Catholic regime, a resentment fuelled by Enlightenment thinkers such as Voltaire. Jean-Jacques Rousseau, considered a philosophical founder of the revolution, wrote it was "manifestly contrary to the law of nature... that a handful of people should gorge themselves with superfluities while the hungry multitude goes in want of necessities."

The Revolution caused a massive shift of power from the Catholic Church to the state; although the extent of religious belief has been questioned, elimination of tolerance for religious minorities meant by 1789 being French also meant being Catholic. The church was the largest individual landowner in France, controlling nearly 10% of all estates and levied tithes, effectively a 10% tax on income, collected from peasant farmers in the form of crops. In return, it provided a minimal level of social support.

In return, the state assumed responsibilities such as paying the clergy and caring for the poor, the sick and the orphaned. On 13 February 1790, religious orders and monasteries were dissolved, while monks and nuns were encouraged to return to private life.

The Civil Constitution of the Clergy of 12 July 1790 made them employees of the state, as well as establishing rates of pay and a system for electing priests and bishops. Pope Pius VI and many French Catholics objected to this since it denied the authority of the Pope over the French Church. In October, thirty bishops wrote a declaration denouncing the law, further fuelling opposition.

When clergy were required to swear loyalty to the Civil Constitution in November 1790, it split the church between the 24% who complied, and the majority who refused. This stiffened popular resistance against state interference, especially in traditionally Catholic areas such as Normandy, Brittany and the Vendée, where only a few priests took the oath and the civilian population turned against the revolution. The result was state-led persecution of "Refractory clergy", many of whom were forced into exile, deported, or executed.

Political divisions 
The period from October 1789 to spring 1791 is usually seen as one of relative tranquility, when some of the most important legislative reforms were enacted. While certainly true, many provincial areas experienced conflict over the source of legitimate authority, where officers of the  had been swept away, but new structures were not yet in place. This was less obvious in Paris, since the formation of the National Guard made it the best policed city in Europe, but growing disorder in the provinces inevitably affected members of the Assembly.

Centrists led by Sieyès, Lafayette, Mirabeau and Bailly created a majority by forging consensus with  like Mounier, and independents including Adrien Duport, Barnave and Alexandre Lameth. At one end of the political spectrum, reactionaries like Cazalès and Maury denounced the Revolution in all its forms, with extremists like Maximilien Robespierre at the other. He and Jean-Paul Marat gained increasing support for opposing the criteria for 'active citizens', which had disenfranchised much of the Parisian proletariat. In January 1790, the National Guard tried to arrest Marat for denouncing Lafayette and Bailly as 'enemies of the people'.

On 14 July 1790, celebrations were held throughout France commemorating the fall of the Bastille, with participants swearing an oath of fidelity to 'the nation, the law and the king.' The  in Paris was attended by Louis XVI and his family, with Talleyrand performing a mass. Despite this show of unity, the Assembly was increasingly divided, while external players like the Paris Commune and National Guard competed for power. One of the most significant was the Jacobin club; originally a forum for general debate, by August 1790 it had over 150 members, split into different factions.

The Assembly continued to develop new institutions; in September 1790, the regional  were abolished and their legal functions replaced by a new independent judiciary, with jury trials for criminal cases. However, moderate deputies were uneasy at popular demands for universal suffrage, labour unions and cheap bread, and over the winter of 1790 and 1791, they passed a series of measures intended to disarm popular radicalism. These included exclusion of poorer citizens from the National Guard, limits on use of petitions and posters, and the June 1791 Le Chapelier Law suppressing trade guilds and any form of worker organisation.

The traditional force for preserving law and order was the army, which was increasingly divided between officers, who largely came from the nobility, and ordinary soldiers. In August 1790, the loyalist General Bouillé suppressed a serious mutiny at Nancy; although congratulated by the Assembly, he was criticised by Jacobin radicals for the severity of his actions. Growing disorder meant many professional officers either left or became émigrés, further destabilising the institution.

Varennes and after

Held in the Tuileries Palace under virtual house arrest, Louis XVI was urged by his brother and wife to re-assert his independence by taking refuge with Bouillé, who was based at Montmédy with 10,000 soldiers considered loyal to the Crown. The royal family left the palace in disguise on the night of 20 June 1791; late the next day, Louis was recognised as he passed through Varennes, arrested and taken back to Paris. The attempted escape had a profound impact on public opinion; since it was clear Louis had been seeking refuge in Austria, the Assembly now demanded oaths of loyalty to the regime, and began preparing for war, while fear of 'spies and traitors' became pervasive.

Despite calls to replace the monarchy with a republic, Louis retained his position but was generally regarded with acute suspicion and forced to swear allegiance to the constitution. A new decree stated retracting this oath, making war upon the nation, or permitting anyone to do so in his name would be considered abdication. However, radicals led by Jacques Pierre Brissot prepared a petition demanding his deposition, and on 17 July, an immense crowd gathered in the Champ de Mars to sign. Led by Lafayette, the National Guard was ordered to "preserve public order" and responded to a barrage of stones by firing into the crowd, killing between 13 and 50 people.

The massacre badly damaged Lafayette's reputation; the authorities responded by closing radical clubs and newspapers, while their leaders went into exile or hiding, including Marat. On 27 August, Emperor Leopold II and King Frederick William II of Prussia issued the Declaration of Pillnitz declaring their support for Louis, and hinting at an invasion of France on his behalf. In reality, the meeting between Leopold and Frederick was primarily to discuss the Partitions of Poland; the Declaration was intended to satisfy Comte d'Artois and other French émigrés but the threat rallied popular support behind the regime.

Based on a motion proposed by Robespierre, existing deputies were barred from elections held in early September for the French Legislative Assembly. Although Robespierre himself was one of those excluded, his support in the clubs gave him a political power base not available to Lafayette and Bailly, who resigned respectively as head of the National Guard and the Paris Commune. The new laws were gathered together in the 1791 Constitution, and submitted to Louis XVI, who pledged to defend it "from enemies at home and abroad". On 30 September, the Constituent Assembly was dissolved, and the Legislative Assembly convened the next day.

Fall of the monarchy 
The Legislative Assembly is often dismissed by historians as an ineffective body, compromised by divisions over the role of the monarchy which were exacerbated by Louis' resistance to limitations on his powers and attempts to reverse them using external support.

After Louis officially accepted the new Constitution, one response was recorded as being "", or "Long live the king – if he keeps his word".

Although a minority, the  control of key committees allowed them to focus on two issues, both intended to portray Louis as hostile to the Revolution by provoking him into using his veto. The first concerned émigrés; between October and November, the Assembly approved measures confiscating their property and threatening them with the death penalty. The second was non-juring priests, whose opposition to the Civil Constitution led to a state of near civil war in southern France, which Bernave tried to defuse by relaxing the more punitive provisions. On 29 November, the Assembly passed a decree giving refractory clergy eight days to comply, or face charges of 'conspiracy against the nation', which even Robespierre viewed as too far, too soon. As expected and indeed intended by their authors, both were vetoed by Louis who was now portrayed as opposed to reform in general.

Accompanying this was a campaign for war against Austria and Prussia, also led by Brissot, whose aims have been interpreted as a mixture of cynical calculation and revolutionary idealism. While exploiting popular anti-Austrianism, it reflected a genuine belief in exporting the values of political liberty and popular sovereignty. Ironically, Marie Antoinette headed a faction within the court that also favoured war, seeing it as a way to win control of the military, and restore royal authority. In December 1791, Louis made a speech in the Assembly giving foreign powers a month to disband the émigrés or face war, which was greeted with enthusiasm by supporters and suspicion from opponents.

On 20 April 1792 the French Revolutionary Wars began when French armies attacked Austrian and Prussian forces along their borders, before suffering a series of disastrous defeats. In an effort to mobilise popular support, the government ordered non-juring priests to swear the oath or be deported, dissolved the Constitutional Guard and replaced it with 20,000 ; Louis agreed to disband the Guard, but vetoed the other two proposals, while Lafayette called on the Assembly to suppress the clubs.

Popular anger increased when details of the Brunswick Manifesto reached Paris on 1 August, threatening 'unforgettable vengeance' should any oppose the Allies in seeking to restore the power of the monarchy. On the morning of 10 August, a combined force of the Paris National Guard and provincial fédérés attacked the Tuileries Palace, killing many of the Swiss Guards protecting it. Louis and his family took refuge with the Assembly and shortly after 11:00 am, the deputies present voted to 'temporarily relieve the king', effectively suspending the monarchy.

First Republic (1792–1795)

Proclamation of the First Republic 

In late August, elections were held for the National Convention; voter restrictions meant those cast fell to 3.3 million, versus 4 million in 1791, while intimidation was widespread. The former Brissotins now split into moderate Girondins led by Brissot, and radical Montagnards, headed by Maximilien Robespierre, Georges Danton and Jean-Paul Marat. While loyalties constantly shifted, around 160 of the 749 deputies were Girondists, 200 Montagnards and 389 members of La Plaine. Led by Bertrand Barère, Pierre Joseph Cambon and Lazare Carnot, as before this central faction acted as a swing vote.

In the September Massacres, between 1,100 and 1,600 prisoners held in Parisian jails were summarily executed, the vast majority of whom were common criminals. A response to the capture of Longwy and Verdun by Prussia, the perpetrators were largely National Guard members and fédérés on their way to the front. Responsibility is disputed, but even moderates expressed sympathy for the action, which soon spread to the provinces; the killings reflected widespread concern over social disorder 

On 20 September, the French army won a stunning victory over the Prussians at Valmy. Emboldened by this, on 22 September the Convention replaced the monarchy with the French First Republic and introduced a new calendar, with 1792 becoming "Year One". The next few months were taken up with the trial of Citoyen Louis Capet, formerly Louis XVI. While the convention was evenly divided on the question of his guilt, members were increasingly influenced by radicals centred in the Jacobin clubs and Paris Commune. The Brunswick Manifesto made it easy to portray Louis as a threat to the Revolution, apparently confirmed when extracts from his personal correspondence were published showed him conspiring with Royalist exiles serving in the Prussian and Austrian armies.

On 17 January 1793, the Assembly condemned Louis to death for "conspiracy against public liberty and general safety", by 361 to 288; another 72 members voted to execute him subject to a variety of delaying conditions. The sentence was carried out on 21 January on the Place de la Révolution, now the Place de la Concorde. Horrified conservatives across Europe called for the destruction of revolutionary France; in February the Convention anticipated this by declaring war on Britain and the Dutch Republic; these countries were later joined by Spain, Portugal, Naples and the Tuscany in the War of the First Coalition.

Political crisis and fall of the Girondins 

The Girondins hoped war would unite the people behind the government and provide an excuse for rising prices and food shortages, but found themselves the target of popular anger. Many left for the provinces. The first conscription measure or levée en masse on 24 February sparked riots in Paris and other regional centres. Already unsettled by changes imposed on the church, in March the traditionally conservative and royalist Vendée rose in revolt. On 18th, Dumouriez was defeated at Neerwinden and defected to the Austrians. Uprisings followed in Bordeaux, Lyon, Toulon, Marseilles and Caen. The Republic seemed on the verge of collapse.

The crisis led to the creation on 6 April 1793 of the Committee of Public Safety, an executive committee accountable to the convention. The Girondins made a fatal political error by indicting Marat before the Revolutionary Tribunal for allegedly directing the September massacres; he was quickly acquitted, further isolating the Girondins from the sans-culottes. When Jacques Hébert called for a popular revolt against the "henchmen of Louis Capet" on 24 May, he was arrested by the Commission of Twelve, a Girondin-dominated tribunal set up to expose 'plots'. In response to protests by the Commune, the Commission warned "if by your incessant rebellions something befalls the representatives of the nation,...Paris will be obliterated".

Growing discontent allowed the clubs to mobilise against the Girondins. Backed by the Commune and elements of the National Guard, on 31 May they attempted to seize power in a coup. Although the coup failed, on 2 June the convention was surrounded by a crowd of up to 80,000, demanding cheap bread, unemployment pay and political reforms, including restriction of the vote to the sans-culottes, and the right to remove deputies at will. Ten members of the commission and another twenty-nine members of the Girondin faction were arrested, and on 10 June, the Montagnards took over the Committee of Public Safety.

Meanwhile, a committee led by Robespierre's close ally Saint-Just was tasked with preparing a new Constitution. Completed in only eight days, it was ratified by the convention on 24 June, and contained radical reforms, including universal male suffrage and abolition of slavery in French colonies. However, normal legal processes were suspended following the assassination of Marat on 13 July by the Girondist Charlotte Corday, which the Committee of Public Safety used as an excuse to take control. The 1793 Constitution was suspended indefinitely in October.

Key areas of focus for the new government included creating a new state ideology, economic regulation and winning the war. They were helped by divisions among their internal opponents; while areas like the Vendée and Brittany wanted to restore the monarchy, most supported the Republic but opposed the regime in Paris. On 17 August, the Convention voted a second levée en masse; despite initial problems in equipping and supplying such large numbers, by mid-October Republican forces had re-taken Lyon, Marseilles and Bordeaux, while defeating Coalition armies at Hondschoote and Wattignies. The new class of military leaders included a young colonel named Napoleon Bonaparte, who was appointed commander of artillery at the siege of Toulon thanks to his friendship with Augustin Robespierre. His success in that role resulted in promotion to the Army of Italy in April 1794, and the beginning of his rise to military and political power.

Reign of Terror 

The Reign of Terror began as a way to harness revolutionary fervour, but quickly degenerated into the settlement of personal grievances. At the end of July, the Convention set price controls over a wide range of goods, with the death penalty for hoarders, and on 9 September 'revolutionary groups' were established to enforce them. On 17th, the Law of Suspects ordered the arrest of suspected "enemies of freedom", initiating what became known as the "Terror". According to archival records, from September 1793 to July 1794 some 16,600 people were executed on charges of counter-revolutionary activity; another 40,000 may have been summarily executed or died awaiting trial.

Fixed prices, death for 'hoarders' or 'profiteers', and confiscation of grain stocks by groups of armed workers meant that by early September, Paris was suffering acute food shortages. However, France's biggest challenge was servicing the huge public debt inherited from the former regime, which continued to expand due to the war. Initially the debt was financed by sales of confiscated property, but this was hugely inefficient; since few would buy assets that might be repossessed, fiscal stability could only be achieved by continuing the war until French counter-revolutionaries had been defeated. As internal and external threats to the Republic increased, the position worsened; dealing with this by printing assignats led to inflation and higher prices.

On 10 October, the Convention recognised the Committee of Public Safety as the supreme Revolutionary Government, and suspended the Constitution until peace was achieved. In mid-October, Marie Antoinette was found guilty of a long list of crimes and guillotined; two weeks later, the Girondist leaders arrested in June were also executed, along with Philippe Égalité. Terror was not confined to Paris; over 2,000 were killed after the recapture of Lyons.

At Cholet on 17 October, the Republican army won a decisive victory over the Vendée rebels, and the survivors escaped into Brittany. Another defeat at Le Mans on 23 December ended the rebellion as a major threat, although the insurgency continued until 1796. The extent of the brutal repression that followed has been debated by French historians since the mid-19th century. Between November 1793 to February 1794, over 4,000 were drowned in the Loire at Nantes under the supervision of Jean-Baptiste Carrier. Historian Reynald Secher claims that as many as 117,000 died between 1793 and 1796. Although those numbers have been challenged, François Furet concluded it "not only revealed massacre and destruction on an unprecedented scale, but a zeal so violent that it has bestowed as its legacy much of the region's identity." 

At the height of the Terror, the slightest hint of counter-revolutionary thought could place one under suspicion, and even its supporters were not immune. Under the pressure of events, splits appeared within the Montagnard faction, with violent disagreements between radical Hébertists and moderates led by Danton. Robespierre saw their dispute as de-stabilising the regime, and, as a deist, he objected to the anti-religious policies advocated by the atheist Hébert, who was arrested and executed on 24 March with 19 of his colleagues, including Carrier. To retain the loyalty of the remaining Hébertists, Danton was arrested and executed on 5 April with Camille Desmoulins, after a show trial that arguably did more damage to Robespierre than any other act in this period.

The Law of 22 Prairial (10 June) denied "enemies of the people" the right to defend themselves. Those arrested in the provinces were now sent to Paris for judgement; from March to July, executions in Paris increased from five to twenty-six a day. Many Jacobins ridiculed the festival of the Cult of the Supreme Being on 8 June, a lavish and expensive ceremony led by Robespierre, who was also accused of circulating claims he was a second Messiah. Relaxation of price controls and rampant inflation caused increasing unrest among the sans-culottes, but the improved military situation reduced fears the Republic was in danger. Many feared their own survival depended on Robespierre's removal; during a meeting on 29 June, three members of the Committee of Public Safety called him a dictator in his face.

Robespierre responded by not attending sessions, allowing his opponents to build a coalition against him. In a speech made to the convention on 26 July, he claimed certain members were conspiring against the Republic, an almost certain death sentence if confirmed. When he refused to give names, the session broke up in confusion. That evening he made the same speech at the Jacobins club, where it was greeted with huge applause and demands for execution of the 'traitors'. It was clear if his opponents did not act, he would; in the Convention next day, Robespierre and his allies were shouted down. His voice failed when he tried to speak, a deputy crying "The blood of Danton chokes him!"

After the Convention authorised his arrest, he and his supporters took refuge in the Hotel de Ville, which was defended by elements of the National Guard. Other units loyal to the Convention stormed the building that evening and detained Robespierre, who severely injured himself attempting suicide. He was executed on 28 July with 19 colleagues, including Saint-Just and Georges Couthon, followed by 83 members of the Commune. The Law of 22 Prairial was repealed, any surviving Girondists reinstated as deputies, and the Jacobin Club was closed and banned.

There are various interpretations of the Terror and the violence with which it was conducted; Marxist historian Albert Soboul saw it as essential to defend the Revolution from external and internal threats. François Furet argues the intense ideological commitment of the revolutionaries and their utopian goals required the extermination of any opposition. A middle position suggests violence was not inevitable but the product of a series of complex internal events, exacerbated by war.

Thermidorian reaction 

The bloodshed did not end with the death of Robespierre; Southern France saw a wave of revenge killings, directed against alleged Jacobins, Republican officials and Protestants. Although the victors of Thermidor asserted control over the Commune by executing their leaders, some of those closely involved in the "Terror" retained their positions. They included Paul Barras, later chief executive of the French Directory, and Joseph Fouché, director of the killings in Lyon who served as Minister of Police under the Directory, the Consulate and Empire. Despite his links to Augustin Robespierre, military success in Italy meant Napoleon Bonaparte escaped censure.

The December 1794 Treaty of La Jaunaye ended the Chouannerie in western France by allowing freedom of worship and the return of non-juring priests. This was accompanied by military success; in January 1795, French forces helped the Dutch Patriots set up the Batavian Republic, securing their northern border. The war with Prussia was concluded in favour of France by the Peace of Basel in April 1795, while Spain made peace shortly thereafter.

However, the Republic still faced a crisis at home. Food shortages arising from a poor 1794 harvest were exacerbated in Northern France by the need to supply the army in Flanders, while the winter was the worst since 1709. By April 1795, people were starving and the assignat was worth only 8% of its face value; in desperation, the Parisian poor rose again. They were quickly dispersed and the main impact was another round of arrests, while Jacobin prisoners in Lyon were summarily executed.

A committee drafted a new constitution, approved by plebiscite on 23 September 1795 and put into place on 27th. Largely designed by Pierre Daunou and Boissy d'Anglas, it established a bicameral legislature, intended to slow down the legislative process, ending the wild swings of policy under the previous unicameral systems. The Council of 500 was responsible for drafting legislation, which was reviewed and approved by the Council of Ancients, an upper house containing 250 men over the age of 40. Executive power was in the hands of five Directors, selected by the Council of Ancients from a list provided by the lower house, with a five-year mandate.

Deputies were chosen by indirect election, a total franchise of around 5 million voting in primaries for 30,000 electors, or 0.6% of the population. Since they were also subject to stringent property qualification, it guaranteed the return of conservative or moderate deputies. In addition, rather than dissolving the previous legislature as in 1791 and 1792, the so-called 'law of two-thirds' ruled only 150 new deputies would be elected each year. The remaining 600 Conventionnels kept their seats, a move intended to ensure stability.

Directory (1795–1799) 

The Directory has a poor reputation amongst historians; for Jacobin sympathisers, it represented the betrayal of the Revolution, while Bonapartists emphasised its corruption to portray Napoleon in a better light. Although these criticisms were certainly valid, it also faced internal unrest, a stagnating economy and an expensive war, while hampered by the impracticality of the constitution. Since the Council of 500 controlled legislation and finance, they could paralyse government at will, and as the Directors had no power to call new elections, the only way to break a deadlock was to rule by decree or use force. As a result, the Directory was characterised by "chronic violence, ambivalent forms of justice, and repeated recourse to heavy-handed repression."

Retention of the  ensured the Thermidorians held a majority in the legislature and three of the five Directors, but they faced an increasing challenge from the right. On 5 October, Convention troops led by Napoleon put down a royalist rising in Paris; when the first elections were held two weeks later, over 100 of the 150 new deputies were royalists of some sort. The power of the Parisian  had been broken by the suppression of the May 1795 revolt; relieved of pressure from below, the Jacobins became natural supporters of the Directory against those seeking to restore the monarchy.

Removal of price controls and a collapse in the value of the  led to inflation and soaring food prices. By April 1796, over 500,000 Parisians were reportedly in need of relief, resulting in the May insurrection known as the Conspiracy of the Equals. Led by the revolutionary François-Noël Babeuf, their demands included the implementation of the 1793 Constitution and a more equitable distribution of wealth. Despite limited support from sections of the military, it was easily crushed, with Babeuf and other leaders executed. Nevertheless, by 1799 the economy had been stabilised and important reforms made allowing steady expansion of French industry; many remained in place for much of the 19th century.

Prior to 1797, three of the five Directors were firmly Republican; Barras, Révellière-Lépeaux and Jean-François Rewbell, as were around 40% of the legislature. The same percentage were broadly centrist or unaffiliated, along with two Directors, Étienne-François Letourneur and Lazare Carnot. Although only 20% were committed Royalists, many centrists supported the restoration of the exiled Louis XVIII of France in the belief this would end the War of the First Coalition with Britain and Austria. The elections of May 1797 resulted in significant gains for the right, with Royalists Jean-Charles Pichegru elected President of the Council of 500, and Barthélemy appointed a Director.

With Royalists apparently on the verge of power, the Republicans staged a coup on 4 September. Using troops from Bonaparte's Army of Italy under Pierre Augereau, the Council of 500 was forced to approve the arrest of Barthélemy, Pichegru and Carnot. The election results were cancelled, sixty-three leading royalists deported to French Guiana and new laws passed against émigrés, Royalists and ultra-Jacobins. Although the power of the monarchists had been destroyed, it opened the way for direct conflict between Barras and his opponents on the left.

Despite general war weariness, fighting continued and the 1798 elections saw a resurgence in Jacobin strength. The invasion of Egypt in July 1798 confirmed European fears of French expansionism, and the War of the Second Coalition began in November. Without a majority in the legislature, the Directors relied on the army to enforcing decrees and extract revenue from conquered territories. This made generals like Bonaparte and Joubert essential political players, while both the army and the Directory became notorious for their corruption.

It has been suggested the Directory did not collapse for economic or military reasons, but because by 1799, many 'preferred the uncertainties of authoritarian rule to the continuing ambiguities of parliamentary politics'. The architect of its end was Sieyès, who when asked what he had done during the Terror allegedly answered "I survived". Nominated to the Directory, his first action was removing Barras, using a coalition that included Talleyrand and former Jacobin Lucien Bonaparte, Napoleon's brother and president of the Council of 500. On 9 November 1799, the Coup of 18 Brumaire replaced the five Directors with the French Consulate, which consisted of three members, Bonaparte, Sieyès, and Roger Ducos; most historians consider this the end point of the French Revolution.

Jacobin ideology  

Some historians, such as François Furet, in Interpreting the French Revolution, and Marisa Linton, in Choosing Terror, have evoked a Jacobin ideology without however defining it. Topics related to this ideology, such as slavery and imperialism, are ignored in these two works.

The Kingdom of France was an empire, and the existence of this empire was never questioned by the revolutionaries, who even maintained slavery for a long time. It was not until February 1794 that they passed a decree to put an end to it. By then, slavery had already been abolished in the most important of the colonies, Saint-Domingue, following the great slave revolt that began in August 1791.

With the revolution, the king had ceased to be the "sovereign" of the empire. The new "sovereign" was now the "people." The revolutionaries, however, had recognized the existence of only one people, the French people, while there were several nations in the empire. Recognizing other peoples would have meant having to recognize their own sovereignty and thus their right to independence. Despite their propaganda for freedom, revolutionaries never recognized this right, or even the right to autonomy.

In the trial of the Girondins, one of the main charges against them was their supposed federalism, considered by the Jacobins as a crime.

Hostile to the federalist system, the right to autonomy and the right to independence for the peoples of the empire, the Jacobins conceived power only concentrated in Paris. On 25 September 1792, Lasource, of Brissot's party, told the convention: "I fear the despotism of Paris, and I do not want those who dispose there of the opinion of the men they mislead to dominate the national convention and the whole France."

Tocqueville emphasized, in L'Ancien Régime et la Révolution, the "immense central power"  created by the revolutionaries, and which Mirabeau had early rejoiced. Tallien, in August 1794, to explain the appearance of the regime of terror, said that it presumed a power that was at once "arbitrary", "absolute" and "endless": "The system of terror presupposes not only [...] arbitrary and absolute power, but also endless power..."

Recognizing only the French nation, the revolutionaries sought to destroy the identity of other nations. At the beginning of the revolution, they abolished the provinces, each of which had its own identity and which, for some of them, represented nations, establishing in their place the division into departments, which will be extended to the new conquests made during the revolutionary and Napoleonic eras.

The revolutionaries had, at first, tolerated languages and dialects other than French. In 1794, under the impetus of Grégoire, by a decree of 2 Thermidor Year II, the Jacobins instituted a policy aimed at the destruction of any language or dialect other than French. The title of Grégoire's report presented to the convention announced its program: Report on the necessity and means of annihilating the patois and universalizing the use of the French language. 

These characteristics of Jacobin ideology, which contrast with the revolutionary discourse on freedom and equality, have been highlighted by critical historians in the tradition of Tocqueville, notably by Hoel, in Jacobin Ideology. They remain little addressed by most historians. In La Révolution française et la fin des colonies, Y. Bénot noted, in a chapter entitled ‘Dans le miroir truqué des historiens’ (‘In the rigged mirror of historians’), the general silence of most of the historiography on matters related to slavery and colonialism.

French Revolutionary Wars 

The Revolution initiated a series of conflicts that began in 1792 and ended only with Napoleon's defeat at Waterloo in 1815. In its early stages, this seemed unlikely; the 1791 Constitution specifically disavowed "war for the purpose of conquest", and although traditional tensions between France and Austria re-emerged in the 1780s, Emperor Joseph II cautiously welcomed the reforms. Austria was at war with the Ottomans, as were the Russians, while both were negotiating with Prussia over partitioning Poland. Most importantly, Britain preferred peace, and as Emperor Leopold II stated after the Declaration of Pillnitz, "without England, there is no case".

In late 1791, factions within the Assembly came to see war as a way to unite the country and secure the Revolution by eliminating hostile forces on its borders and establishing its "natural frontiers". France declared war on Austria in April 1792 and issued the first conscription orders, with recruits serving for twelve months. By the time peace finally came in 1815, the conflict had involved every major European power as well as the United States, redrawn the map of Europe and expanded into the Americas, the Middle East, and the Indian Ocean.

From 1701 to 1801, the population of Europe grew from 118 to 187 million; combined with new mass production techniques, this allowed belligerents to support large armies, requiring the mobilisation of national resources. It was a different kind of war, fought by nations rather than kings, intended to destroy their opponents' ability to resist, but also to implement deep-ranging social change. While all wars are political to some degree, this period was remarkable for the emphasis placed on reshaping boundaries and the creation of entirely new European states.

In April 1792, French armies invaded the Austrian Netherlands but suffered a series of setbacks before victory over an Austrian-Prussian army at Valmy in September. After defeating a second Austrian army at Jemappes on 6 November, they occupied the Netherlands, areas of the Rhineland, Nice and Savoy. Emboldened by this success, in February 1793 France declared war on the Dutch Republic, Spain and Britain, beginning the War of the First Coalition. However, the expiration of the 12-month term for the 1792 recruits forced the French to relinquish their conquests. In August, new conscription measures were passed and by May 1794 the French army had between 750,000 and 800,000 men. Despite high rates of desertion, this was large enough to manage multiple internal and external threats; for comparison, the combined Prussian-Austrian army was less than 90,000.

By February 1795, France had annexed the Austrian Netherlands, established their frontier on the left bank of the Rhine and replaced the Dutch Republic with the Batavian Republic, a satellite state. These victories led to the collapse of the anti-French coalition; Prussia made peace in April 1795, followed soon after by Spain, leaving Britain and Austria as the only major powers still in the war. In October 1797, a series of defeats by Bonaparte in Italy led Austria to agree to the Treaty of Campo Formio, in which they formally ceded the Netherlands and recognised the Cisalpine Republic.

Fighting continued for two reasons; first, French state finances had come to rely on indemnities levied on their defeated opponents. Second, armies were primarily loyal to their generals, for whom the wealth achieved by victory and the status it conferred became objectives in themselves. Leading soldiers like Hoche, Pichegru and Carnot wielded significant political influence and often set policy; Campo Formio was approved by Bonaparte, not the Directory, which strongly objected to terms it considered too lenient.

Despite these concerns, the Directory never developed a realistic peace programme, fearing the destabilising effects of peace and the consequent demobilisation of hundreds of thousands of young men. As long as the generals and their armies stayed away from Paris, they were happy to allow them to continue fighting, a key factor behind sanctioning Bonaparte's invasion of Egypt. This resulted in aggressive and opportunistic policies, leading to the War of the Second Coalition in November 1798.

Slavery, imperialism, and the Haitian Revolution

Although the French Revolution had a dramatic impact in numerous areas of Europe, the French colonies felt a particular influence. As the Martinican author Aimé Césaire put it, "there was in each French colony a specific revolution, that occurred on the occasion of the French Revolution, in tune with it."

The Revolution in Saint-Domingue was the most notable example of slave uprisings in French colonies. In the 1780s, Saint-Domingue was France's wealthiest possession, producing more sugar than all the British West Indies islands combined. 

The revolutionaries remained imperialists who maintained the system of slavery until it was dismantled in Saint-Domingue, following the slave revolt that began in August 1791. Sonthonax and Polverel were the two civil commissioners who officially proclaimed the abolition of slavery in 1793. The National Convention did not vote to abolish slavery until February 1794 after three deputies from Saint-Domingue arrived in France to explain why slavery had been abolished in the colony.

However, the 1794 decree was only implemented in Saint-Domingue, Guadeloupe, and Guyane, and was a dead letter in Senegal, Mauritius, Réunion, and Martinique, the last of which had been captured by the British, and as such remained unaffected by French law.

The revolutionaries did not recognize the right to independence, nor autonomy, to the peoples of the French empire. Toussaint Louverture, who emerged during the struggle against the French army as a military leader, nevertheless managed to obtain autonomy by the fact, which was a prelude and condition for future independence.

Media and symbolism

Newspapers 

Newspapers and pamphlets played a central role in stimulating and defining the Revolution. Prior to 1789, there have been a small number of heavily censored newspapers that needed a royal licence to operate, but the Estates-General created an enormous demand for news, and over 130 newspapers appeared by the end of the year. Among the most significant were Marat's L'Ami du peuple and Elysée Loustallot's . Over the next decade, more than 2,000 newspapers were founded, 500 in Paris alone. Most lasted only a matter of weeks but they became the main communication medium, combined with the very large pamphlet literature.

Newspapers were read aloud in taverns and clubs, and circulated hand to hand. There was a widespread assumption that writing was a vocation, not a business, and the role of the press was the advancement of civic republicanism. By 1793 the radicals were most active but initially the royalists flooded the country with their publication the "" (Friends of the King) until they were suppressed.

Revolutionary symbols
To illustrate the differences between the new Republic and the old regime, the leaders needed to implement a new set of symbols to be celebrated instead of the old religious and monarchical symbols. To this end, symbols were borrowed from historic cultures and redefined, while those of the old regime were either destroyed or reattributed acceptable characteristics. These revised symbols were used to instil in the public a new sense of tradition and reverence for the Enlightenment and the Republic.

La Marseillaise

"La Marseillaise" became the national anthem of France. The song was written and composed in 1792 by Claude Joseph Rouget de Lisle, and was originally titled "Chant de guerre pour l'Armée du Rhin". The French National Convention adopted it as the First Republic's anthem in 1795. It acquired its nickname after being sung in Paris by volunteers from Marseille marching on the capital.

The song is the first example of the "European march" anthemic style, while the evocative melody and lyrics led to its widespread use as a song of revolution and incorporation into many pieces of classical and popular music. De Lisle was instructed to 'produce a hymn which conveys to the soul of the people the enthusiasm which it (the music) suggests.'

Guillotine

The guillotine remains "the principal symbol of the Terror in the French Revolution." Invented by a physician during the Revolution as a quicker, more efficient and more distinctive form of execution, the guillotine became a part of popular culture and historic memory. It was celebrated on the left as the people's avenger, for example in the revolutionary song La guillotine permanente, and cursed as the symbol of the Terror by the right.

Its operation became a popular entertainment that attracted great crowds of spectators. Vendors sold programmes listing the names of those scheduled to die. Many people came day after day and vied for the best locations from which to observe the proceedings; knitting women (tricoteuses) formed a cadre of hardcore regulars, inciting the crowd. Parents often brought their children. By the end of the Terror, the crowds had thinned drastically. Repetition had staled even this most grisly of entertainments, and audiences grew bored.

Cockade, tricolore, and liberty cap

Cockades were widely worn by revolutionaries beginning in 1789. They now pinned the blue-and-red cockade of Paris onto the white cockade of the Ancien Régime. Camille Desmoulins asked his followers to wear green cockades on 12 July 1789. The Paris militia, formed on 13 July, adopted a blue and red cockade. Blue and red are the traditional colours of Paris, and they are used on the city's coat of arms. Cockades with various colour schemes were used during the storming of the Bastille on 14 July.

The Liberty cap, also known as the Phrygian cap, or pileus, is a brimless, felt cap that is conical in shape with the tip pulled forward. It reflects Roman republicanism and liberty, alluding to the Roman ritual of manumission, in which a freed slave receives the bonnet as a symbol of his newfound liberty.

Role of women 

The role of women in the Revolution has long been a topic of debate. Deprived of political rights under the Ancien Régime, the 1791 Constitution classed them as "passive" citizens, leading to demands for social and political equality for women and an end to male domination. They expressed these demands using pamphlets and clubs such as the Cercle Social, whose largely male members viewed themselves as contemporary feminists. However, in October 1793, the Assembly banned all women's clubs and the movement was crushed; this was driven by the emphasis on masculinity in a wartime situation, antagonism towards feminine "interference" in state affairs due to Marie Antoinette, and traditional male supremacy. A decade later the Napoleonic Code confirmed and perpetuated women's second-class status.

At the beginning of the Revolution, women took advantage of events to force their way into the political sphere, swore oaths of loyalty, "solemn declarations of patriotic allegiance, [and] affirmations of the political responsibilities of citizenship." Activists included Girondists like Olympe de Gouges, author of the Declaration of the Rights of Woman and of the Female Citizen, and Charlotte Corday, the killer of Marat. Others like Théroigne de Méricourt, Pauline Léon and the Society of Revolutionary Republican Women supported the Jacobins, staged demonstrations in the National Assembly and took part in the October 1789 March to Versailles. Despite this, the constitutions of 1791 and 1793 denied them political rights and democratic citizenship.

On 20 June 1792 a number of armed women took part in a procession that "passed through the halls of the Legislative Assembly, into the Tuileries Garden, and then through the King's residence." Women also assumed a special role in the funeral of Marat, following his murder on 13 July 1793 by Corday; as part of the funeral procession, they carried the bathtub in which he died, as well as a shirt stained with his blood. On 20 May 1793 women were in the forefront of a crowd demanding "bread and the Constitution of 1793"; when they went unnoticed, they began "sacking shops, seizing grain and kidnapping officials."

The Society of Revolutionary Republican Women, a militant group on the far left, demanded a law in 1793 that would compel all women to wear the tricolour cockade to demonstrate their loyalty to the Republic. They also demanded vigorous price controls to keep bread – the major food of the poor people – from becoming too expensive. After the Convention passed the law in September 1793, the Revolutionary Republican Women demanded vigorous enforcement, but were countered by market women, former servants, and religious women who adamantly opposed price controls (which would drive them out of business) and resented attacks on the aristocracy and on religion. Fist fights broke out in the streets between the two factions of women.

Meanwhile, the men who controlled the Jacobins rejected the Revolutionary Republican Women as dangerous rabble-rousers. At this point the Jacobins controlled the government; they dissolved the Society of Revolutionary Republican Women, and decreed that all women's clubs and associations were illegal. They sternly reminded women to stay home and tend to their families by leaving public affairs to the men. Organised women were permanently shut out of the French Revolution after 30 October 1793.

Prominent women 
Olympe de Gouges wrote a number of plays, short stories, and novels. Her publications emphasised that women and men are different, but this shouldn't prevent equality under the law. In her Declaration of the Rights of Woman and of the Female Citizen she insisted that women deserved rights, especially in areas concerning them directly, such as divorce and recognition of illegitimate children.

Madame Roland (a.k.a. Manon or Marie Roland) was another important female activist. Her political focus was not specifically on women or their liberation. She focused on other aspects of the government, but was a feminist by virtue of the fact that she was a woman working to influence the world. Her personal letters to leaders of the Revolution influenced policy; in addition, she often hosted political gatherings of the Brissotins, a political group which allowed women to join. As she was led to the scaffold, Madame Roland shouted "O liberty! What crimes are committed in thy name!" Many activists were punished for their actions, while some were executed for "conspiring against the unity and the indivisibility of the Republic".

Counter-revolutionary women 
Counter-revolutionary women resisted what they saw as the increasing intrusion of the state into their lives. One major consequence was the dechristianisation of France, a movement strongly rejected by many devout people; especially for women living in rural areas, the closing of the churches meant a loss of normality. This sparked a counter-revolutionary movement led by women; while supporting other political and social changes, they opposed the dissolution of the Catholic Church and revolutionary cults like the Cult of the Supreme Being. Olwen Hufton argues some wanted to protect the Church from heretical changes enforced by revolutionaries, viewing themselves as "defenders of faith".

Economically, many peasant women refused to sell their goods for assignats because this form of currency was unstable and was backed by the sale of confiscated Church property. By far the most important issue to counter-revolutionary women was the passage and the enforcement of the Civil Constitution of the Clergy in 1790. In response to this measure, women in many areas began circulating anti-oath pamphlets and refused to attend masses held by priests who had sworn oaths of loyalty to the Republic. These women continued to adhere to traditional practices such as Christian burials and naming their children after saints in spite of revolutionary decrees to the contrary.

Economic policies 

The Revolution abolished many economic constraints imposed by the Ancien Régime, including church tithes and feudal dues although tenants often paid higher rents and taxes. All church lands were nationalised, along with those owned by Royalist exiles, which were used to back paper currency known as assignats, and the feudal guild system eliminated. It also abolished the highly inefficient system of tax farming, whereby private individuals would collect taxes for a hefty fee. The government seized the foundations that had been set up (starting in the 13th century) to provide an annual stream of revenue for hospitals, poor relief, and education. The state sold the lands but typically local authorities did not replace the funding and so most of the nation's charitable and school systems were massively disrupted

Between 1790 and 1796, industrial and agricultural output dropped, foreign trade plunged, and prices soared, forcing the government to finance expenditure by issuing ever increasing quantities assignats. When this resulted in escalating inflation, the response was to impose price controls and persecute private speculators and traders, creating a Black market. Between 1789 and 1793, the annual deficit increased from 10% to 64% of gross national product, while annual inflation reached 3,500% after a poor harvest in 1794 and the removal of price controls. The assignats were withdrawn in 1796 but inflation continued until the introduction of the gold-based Franc germinal in 1803.

Long-term impact 

The French Revolution had a major impact on European and Western history, by ending feudalism and creating the path for future advances in broadly defined individual freedoms. Its impact on French nationalism was profound, while also stimulating nationalist movements throughout Europe. Modern historians argue the concept of the nation state was a direct consequence of the Revolution.

France 
The impact of the Revolution on French society was enormous and led to numerous changes, some of which were widely accepted, while others continue to be debated. Under Louis XIV, political power was centralised at Versailles and controlled by the monarch, whose power derived from immense personal wealth, control over the army and appointment of clergy, provincial governors, lawyers and judges. In less than a year, the king was reduced to a figurehead, the nobility deprived of titles and estates and the church of its monasteries and property. Clergy, judges and magistrates were controlled by the state, and the army sidelined, with military power placed held by the revolutionary National Guard. The central elements of 1789 were the slogan "Liberty, Equality and Fraternity" and "The Declaration of the Rights of Man and the Citizen", which Lefebvre calls "the incarnation of the Revolution as a whole."

The long-term impact on France was profound, shaping politics, society, religion and ideas, and polarising politics for more than a century. Historian François Aulard writes:

"From the social point of view, the Revolution consisted in the suppression of what was called the feudal system, in the emancipation of the individual, in greater division of landed property, the abolition of the privileges of noble birth, the establishment of equality, the simplification of life.... The French Revolution differed from other revolutions in being not merely national, for it aimed at benefiting all humanity."

Status of the Catholic church 
One of the most heated controversies during the Revolution was the status of the Catholic Church. In 1788, it held a dominant position within society; to be French meant to be a Catholic. By 1799, much of its property and institutions had been confiscated and its senior leaders dead or in exile. Its cultural influence was also under attack, with efforts made to strip civil life of religious elements such as Sundays, holy days, saints, prayers, rituals and ceremonies. Ultimately these attempts not only failed but aroused a furious reaction among the pious; opposition to these changes was a key factor behind the revolt in the Vendée.

Over the centuries, charitable foundations had been set up to fund hospitals, poor relief, and schools; when these were confiscated and sold off, the funding was not replaced, causing massive disruption to these support systems. Under the Ancien Régime, medical assistance for the rural poor was often provided by nuns, acting as nurses but also physicians, surgeons, and apothecaries; the Revolution abolished most of these orders without replacing organised nursing support. Demand remained strong and after 1800 nuns resumed their work in hospitals and on rural estates. They were tolerated by officials because they had widespread support and were a link between elite male physicians and distrustful peasants who needed help.

The church was a primary target during the Terror, due to its association with "counter-revolutionary" elements, resulting in the persecution of priests and destruction of churches and religious images throughout France. An effort was made to replace the Catholic Church altogether with the Cult of Reason, and with civic festivals replacing religious ones, leading to attacks by locals on state officials. These policies were promoted by the atheist Hébert and opposed by the deist Robespierre, who denounced the campaign and replaced the Cult of Reason with the Cult of the Supreme Being.

The Concordat of 1801 established the rules for a relationship between the Catholic Church and French State that lasted until it was abrogated by the French Third Republic on 11 December 1905. The Concordat was a compromise that restored some of the Church's traditional roles but not its power, lands or monasteries; the clergy became public officials controlled by Paris, not Rome, while Protestants and Jews gained equal rights. However, debate continues into the present over the role of religion in the public sphere and related issues such as church-controlled schools. Recent arguments over the use of Muslim religious symbols in schools, such as wearing headscarves, have been explicitly linked to the conflict over Catholic rituals and symbols during the Revolution.

Economics 
Two thirds of France was employed in agriculture, which was transformed by the Revolution. With the breakup of large estates controlled by the Church and the nobility and worked by hired hands, rural France became more a land of small independent farms. Harvest taxes were ended, such as the tithe and seigneurial dues, much to the relief of the peasants. Primogeniture was ended both for nobles and peasants, thereby weakening the family patriarch, and led to a fall in the born rate since all children had a share in the family property. Cobban argues the Revolution bequeathed to the nation "a ruling class of landowners."

In the cities, entrepreneurship on a small scale flourished, as restrictive monopolies, privileges, barriers, rules, taxes and guilds gave way. However, the British blockade virtually ended overseas and colonial trade, hurting the cities and their supply chains. Overall, the Revolution did not greatly change the French business system, and probably helped freeze in place the horizons of the small business owner. The typical businessman owned a small store, mill or shop, with family help and a few paid employees; large-scale industry was less common than in other industrialising nations.

Economic historians dispute the impact on income per capita caused by the emigration of more than 100,000 individuals during the Revolution, the vast majority of whom were supporters of the old regime. One suggestion is the resulting fragmentation of agricultural holdings had a significant negative impact in the early years of 19th century, then became positive in the second half of the century because it facilitated the rise in human capital investments. Others argue the redistribution of land had an immediate positive impact on agricultural productivity, before the scale of these gains gradually declined over the course of the 19th century.

Constitutionalism 
The Revolution meant an end to arbitrary royal rule and held out the promise of rule by law under a constitutional order, but it did not rule out a monarch. Napoleon as emperor set up a constitutional system (although he remained in full control), and the restored Bourbons were forced to go along with one. After the abdication of Napoleon III in 1871, the monarchists probably had a voting majority, but they were so factionalised they could not agree on who should be king, and instead the French Third Republic was launched with a deep commitment to upholding the ideals of the Revolution. The conservative Catholic enemies of the Revolution came to power in Vichy France (1940–44), and tried with little success to undo its heritage, but they kept it a republic. Vichy denied the principle of equality and tried to replace the Revolutionary watchwords "Liberty, Equality, Fraternity" with "Work, Family, and Fatherland." However, there were no efforts by the Bourbons, Vichy or anyone else to restore the privileges that had been stripped away from the nobility in 1789. France permanently became a society of equals under the law.

Communism 
The Jacobin cause was picked up by Marxists in the mid-19th century and became an element of communist thought around the world. In the Soviet Union, "Gracchus" Babeuf was regarded as a hero.

Europe outside France 
Economic historians Dan Bogart, Mauricio Drelichman, Oscar Gelderblom, and Jean-Laurent Rosenthal described codified law as the French Revolution's "most significant export." They wrote, "While restoration returned most of their power to the absolute monarchs who had been deposed by Napoleon, only the most recalcitrant ones, such as Ferdinand VII of Spain, went to the trouble of completely reversing the legal innovations brought on by the French." They also note that the French Revolution and the Napoleonic Wars caused England, Spain, Prussia and the Dutch Republic to centralize their fiscal systems to an unprecedented extent in order to finance the military campaigns of the Napoleonic Wars.

According to Daron Acemoglu, Davide Cantoni, Simon Johnson, and James A. Robinson the French Revolution had long-term effects in Europe. They suggest that "areas that were occupied by the French and that underwent radical institutional reform experienced more rapid urbanization and economic growth, especially after 1850. There is no evidence of a negative effect of French invasion."

A 2016 study in the European Economic Review found that the areas of Germany that were occupied by France in the 19th century and in which the Code Napoleon was applied have higher levels of trust and cooperation today.

Britain 
On 16 July 1789, two days after the Storming of the Bastille, John Frederick Sackville, serving as ambassador to France, reported to Secretary of State for Foreign Affairs Francis Osborne, 5th Duke of Leeds, "Thus, my Lord, the greatest revolution that we know anything of has been effected with, comparatively speaking – if the magnitude of the event is considered – the loss of very few lives. From this moment we may consider France as a free country, the King a very limited monarch, and the nobility as reduced to a level with the rest of the nation." Yet in Britain the majority, especially among the aristocracy, strongly opposed the French Revolution. Britain led and funded the series of coalitions that fought France from 1793 to 1815, and then restored the Bourbons.

Philosophically and politically, Britain was in debate over the rights and wrongs of revolution, in the abstract and in practicalities. The Revolution Controversy was a "pamphlet war" set off by the publication of A Discourse on the Love of Our Country, a speech given by Richard Price to the Revolution Society on 4 November 1789, supporting the French Revolution (as he had the American Revolution), and saying that patriotism actually centers around loving the people and principles of a nation, not its ruling class. Edmund Burke responded in November 1790 with his own pamphlet, Reflections on the Revolution in France, attacking the French Revolution as a threat to the aristocracy of all countries. William Coxe opposed Price's premise that one's country is principles and people, not the State itself.

Conversely, two seminal political pieces of political history were written in Price's favour, supporting the general right of the French people to replace their State. One of the first of these "pamphlets" into print was A Vindication of the Rights of Men by Mary Wollstonecraft (better known for her later treatise, sometimes described as the first feminist text, A Vindication of the Rights of Woman); Wollstonecraft's title was echoed by Thomas Paine's Rights of Man, published a few months later. In 1792 Christopher Wyvill published Defence of Dr. Price and the Reformers of England, a plea for reform and moderation.

This exchange of ideas has been described as "one of the great political debates in British history". Even in France, there was a varying degree of agreement during this debate, English participants generally opposing the violent means that the Revolution bent itself to for its ends.

In Ireland, the effect was to transform what had been an attempt by Protestant settlers to gain some autonomy into a mass movement led by the Society of United Irishmen involving Catholics and Protestants. It stimulated the demand for further reform throughout Ireland, especially in Ulster. The upshot was a revolt in 1798, led by Wolfe Tone, that was crushed by Britain.

Germany 
German reaction to the Revolution swung from favourable to antagonistic. At first it brought liberal and democratic ideas, the end of guilds, serfdom and the Jewish ghetto. It brought economic freedoms and agrarian and legal reform. Above all the antagonism helped stimulate and shape German nationalism.

Switzerland 

The French invaded Switzerland and turned it into the "Helvetic Republic" (1798–1803), a French puppet state. French interference with localism and traditions was deeply resented in Switzerland, although some reforms took hold and survived in the later period of restoration.

Belgium 

The region of modern-day Belgium was divided between two polities: the Austrian Netherlands and Prince-Bishopric of Liège. Both territories experienced revolutions in 1789. In the Austrian Netherlands, the Brabant Revolution succeeded in expelling Austrian forces and established the new United Belgian States. The Liège Revolution expelled the tyrannical Prince-Bishop and installed a republic. Both failed to attract international support. By December 1790, the Brabant revolution had been crushed and Liège was subdued the following year.

During the Revolutionary Wars, the French invaded and occupied the region between 1794 and 1814, a time known as the French period. The new government enforced new reforms, incorporating the region into France itself. New rulers were sent in by Paris. Belgian men were drafted into the French wars and heavily taxed. Nearly everyone was Catholic, but the Church was repressed. Resistance was strong in every sector, as Belgian nationalism emerged to oppose French rule. The French legal system, however, was adopted, with its equal legal rights, and abolition of class distinctions. Belgium now had a government bureaucracy selected by merit.

Antwerp regained access to the sea and grew quickly as a major port and business centre. France promoted commerce and capitalism, paving the way for the ascent of the bourgeoisie and the rapid growth of manufacturing and mining. In economics, therefore, the nobility declined while middle-class Belgian entrepreneurs flourished because of their inclusion in a large market, paving the way for Belgium's leadership role after 1815 in the Industrial Revolution on the Continent.

Scandinavia 

The Kingdom of Denmark adopted liberalising reforms in line with those of the French Revolution, with no direct contact. Reform was gradual and the regime itself carried out agrarian reforms that had the effect of weakening absolutism by creating a class of independent peasant freeholders. Much of the initiative came from well-organised liberals who directed political change in the first half of the 19th century.

The Constitution of Norway of 1814 was inspired by the French Revolution, and was considered to be one of the most liberal and democratic constitutions at the time.

North America

Canada 
Coverage of the Revolution in the then Province of Quebec took place against the background of an ongoing campaign for constitutional reform by Loyalist emigrants from the United States. With the press reliant on reprinting articles from British newspapers, local opinion followed them in being generally positive on the aims and objectives of the revolutionaries. This made it increasingly difficult to justify the withholding of electoral rights, with the British Home Secretary William Grenville remarking it was difficult to deny "to so large a body of British Subjects, the benefits of the British Constitution". This led to the "Constitutional Act 1791", which split the Province into two separate colonies, each with its own electoral assembly, the predominantly French-speaking Lower Canada and predominantly English-speaking Upper Canada.

French migration into the Canadas significantly declined during and after the Revolution, with only limited numbers of artisans, professionals, and religious emigres permitted to settle in that period. Most emigres settled in Montreal or Quebec City, although French nobleman Joseph-Geneviève de Puisaye and a small group of Royalists settled lands north of York, modern day Toronto. The influx of religious migrants also reinvigorated the local Catholic Church, with exiled priests establishing a number of parishes throughout the Canadas.

United States 
The French Revolution deeply polarised American politics, and this polarisation led to the creation of the First Party System. In 1793, as war broke out in Europe, the Democratic-Republican Party led by former American minister to France Thomas Jefferson favored revolutionary France and pointed to the 1778 treaty that was still in effect. George Washington and his unanimous cabinet, including Jefferson, decided that the treaty did not bind the United States to enter the war. Washington proclaimed neutrality instead. Under President John Adams, a Federalist, an undeclared naval war took place with France from 1798 until 1799, often called the "Quasi War". Jefferson became president in 1801, but was hostile to Napoleon as a dictator and emperor. However, the two entered negotiations over the Louisiana Territory and agreed to the Louisiana Purchase in 1803, an acquisition that substantially increased the size of the United States.

Historiography 

The French Revolution has received enormous amounts of historical attention, both from the general public as well as scholars and academics, while perspectives on its significance and major developments have often been characterised as falling along ideological lines. In general, studies of the Revolution initially focused on political ideas and developments, but gradually shifted towards social history that analyses its impact on individuals.

Contemporary conservatives like Edmund Burke and Friedrich von Gentz argued it was the product of a few conspiratorial individuals who brainwashed the masses into subverting the old order, a claim rooted in the belief that the revolutionaries had no legitimate complaints. In the 19th century, the Revolution was heavily analysed by economists and political scientists like Alexis de Tocqueville, who suggested it was the result of a more prosperous middle class becoming conscious of its social importance. Perhaps the most influential was Karl Marx, who viewed the social class nature of the Revolution as fundamental to understanding human social evolution itself. He argued the egalitarian values it introduced gave rise to a classless and co-operative model for society called "socialism", which found direct expression in the 1870 to 1871 Paris Commune.

For much of the 20th century, historians influenced by Marx, notably Albert Soboul, emphasised the role of the peasants and urban workers in the Revolution and presented it as class struggle. The central theme of this argument was that the Revolution emerged from the rising bourgeoisie, with support from the sans-culottes, who united to destroy the aristocracy. However, Western scholars largely abandoned Marxist interpretations in the 1990s; the theme of class conflict was widely discredited, but no new explanatory model has gained widespread support. Nevertheless, in Western history the Revolution is still seen as a key dividing point between the early modern and late modern periods, and thus one of its most important events.

Within France itself, the Revolution permanently crippled the power of the aristocracy and drained the wealth of the Church, although the two institutions survived despite the damage they sustained. After the collapse of the First French Empire in 1815, the French public lost many of the rights and privileges earned since the Revolution, but remembered the participatory politics that characterised the period. According to one historian: "Thousands of men and even many women gained firsthand experience in the political arena: they talked, read, and listened in new ways; they voted; they joined new organisations; and they marched for their political goals. Revolution became a tradition, and republicanism an enduring option."

It is also suggested the French underwent a fundamental transformation in self-identity, evidenced by the elimination of privileges and their replacement by intrinsic human rights, as well as a decline in social deference that highlighted the principle of equality throughout the Revolution. The Revolution represented the most significant and dramatic challenge to political absolutism up to that point in history and spread democratic ideals throughout Europe and ultimately the world.

Biases in the historiography of the French Revolution  

The history of the French Revolution has generally been written with three strong biases: the white one, the French one, and the Jacobin one.

The white bias minimizes or ignores the problem of slavery, the question of colonies, and the Haitian Revolution.
In his foreword to R. R. Palmer's book, The Age of the Democratic Revolution: A Political History of Europe and America, D. Armitage noted the "omission of the Haitian revolution" from the work.
In his book Silencing the Past: Power and the Production of History, in the chapter 'An Unthinkable History. The Haitian Revolution as a Non-Event', M.-R. Trouillot said of the Haitian Revolution that it is "the revolution that the world forgot".
F. Gauthier wrote for her part that "until A. Césaire, the historiography of the French Revolution ignored the colonial problem".

The French bias includes the white one, but it minimizes or ignores more generally all subjects related to colonies and imperialism, regardless of the question of slavery, which concerned only the black population.
The French bias also attributes responsibility for the wars declared in 1792 and 1793 by France to Austria, England, etc., to these very powers. Historians such as Mignet, Thiers and Michelet have adopted this view. Mignet, for example, wrote in his Histoire de la révolution française: "France was threatened by the fate that Holland had just suffered and perhaps that of Poland. The whole question was reduced to waiting or anticipating the war, taking advantage of the enthusiasm of the people or letting it cool. The real author of war is not the one who declares it, but the one who makes it necessary."
This view has been challenged, among others, by Blanning, in The origins of the French revolutionary wars, and before him by Michon, in Essai sur l'histoire du parti feuillant. Both blamed the war on France. Michon wrote, for example: "There was no question of an external danger, of aggression by foreign powers..."

The Jacobin bias generally includes the white and French ones, but not always. 
For example, because of the debate between supporters and opponents of the war, with Brissot and Robespierre as the most notable figures, Brissot advocating war, Robespierre opposing it, neo-Jacobin historians like Michon have blamed the war, not on Austria and the others great powers, but on the Girondins. As Blanning said: "The predominantly neo-Jacobin tone of most French historical writing on the Revolution has cost Brissot and his supporters dear in terms of reputation. Georges Michon, whose detestation of Brissot was matched only by his adulation of Robespierre, delivered the definitive indictment: 'The war', he stated baldly, 'was desired and provoked by the Girondins.'"
The Jacobin bias is also particularly visible in the favorable sentiment with which the fall of the Girondins at the end of May-beginning of June 1793 is perceived.

If white, French and Jacobin biases are so strong among historians, it is because they were those of the majority of revolutionaries, with whom the majority of historians identify themselves. As Blanning said, the tone of most French historical writing on the Revolution is "predominantly neo-Jacobin". 
The identification of historians with revolutionaries has been recognized and often strongly claimed by historians themselves. The "revolutionary heroes", as A. Cobban called them, have become, in fact, very few, the two main ones being Danton and Robespierre, two Jacobins. And because they were ultimately strongly opposed to each other, so are historians.
Danton was the "hero" of Michelet and Aulard. Mathiez, although a disciple of Aulard, nevertheless devoted much of his work to destroy Danton's reputation. "Danton’s reputation, said Cobban, can never more than partially recover from the vendetta waged in the name of Robespierre against him by Mathiez." 
Robespierre was the "hero" of the Marxist historians Mathiez, Lefebvre and Soboul, but he was and is also the "hero" of non-Marxist historians like Hamel, Furet, Linton and many others.

There remain, however, historians who fight the Jacobin bias. 

Among them are those who identify themselves with non-Jacobin revolutionaries, especially Brissot and those of his party. 
Although a major figure among revolutionaries, Brissot has rarely been prized by historians. A notable exception is J. Israel in Revolutionary Ideas. As a result, he was attacked by Robespierre's partisans. Israel is interested not only in Brissot but in all those around him, men like Condorcet, for example, linking all these revolutionaries to the European intellectuals he calls the "radical enlighteners". In ‘A Response to Chappey and Missé’, Israel wrote: "I want to show that as regards the democratic republican core of the French Revolution, Robespierre was in no way "La révolution incarnée", quite the opposite. Obviously, my book clashes outright with the recent trend in French Revolution historiography, since 2000, that some now triumphantly designate the "retour de Robespierre." [...] Belissa and Bosc construe the maligners and detractors of Robespierre as "contra-revolutionnaire" but that term scarcely applies to the radical enlighteners I am focusing on..."

In opposition to historians who identify with revolutionaries are critical historians who take an outside look at the revolution, in the tradition of Tocqueville and his book L'Ancien régime et la Révolution. Among those historians who radically combat Jacobin, French and, more rarely, white biases, are Taine, Cochin, Sorel, Cobban, Doyle, Bénot, Blanning and Hoel.
For these historians, the French Revolution is less a revolution than an acceleration of an evolution underway under the monarchy. The revolution is not to be seen in ideological terms, but essentially as a "power struggle", whether at the international level or within the French Empire, as Cobban said: "True, public opinion in all countries saw the struggle as an ideological one between revolution and established order; but those who actually determined international policies were free from this illusion, though they had to allow for and were prepared to make use of it in others. The history of the Revolutionary and Napoleonic Wars can be told almost exclusively in terms of power politics and explained by the traditions of the countries involved and the personalities of their rulers and ministers. [...] The frank recognition of the dominance of power politics in international relations has not been without its effect on the writing of domestic French history."

See also 
 Age of Revolution
 Bourgeois revolution
 Cordeliers
 Glossary of the French Revolution
 History of France
 List of people associated with the French Revolution
 List of political groups in the French Revolution
 List of films set during the French Revolution and French Revolutionary Wars
 Musée de la Révolution française
 Paris in the 18th Century
 Timeline of the French Revolution

Notes

References

Sources

Bibliography

Surveys and reference 
 Andress, David, ed. The Oxford Handbook of the French Revolution (Oxford University Press, 2015). excerpt, 714 pp; 37 articles by experts
 Aulard, François-Alphonse. The French Revolution, a Political History, 1789–1804 (4 vol. 1910); famous classic; volume 1 1789–1792 online; Volume 2 1792–95 online
 Azurmendi, Joxe (1997). The democrats and the violent. Mirande's critique of the French Revolution. Philosophical viewpoint. (Original: Demokratak eta biolentoak, Donostia: Elkar ).
 Ballard, Richard. A New Dictionary of the French Revolution (2011) excerpt and text search
 Bosher, J.F. The French Revolution (1989) 365 pp
 Davies, Peter. The French Revolution: A Beginner's Guide (2009), 192 pp
 Gershoy, Leo. The French Revolution and Napoleon (1945) 585 pp
 Gershoy, Leo. The Era of the French Revolution, 1789–1799 (1957), brief summary with some primary sources
 Gottschalk, Louis R. The Era of the French Revolution (1929), cover 1780s to 1815
 Hanson, Paul R. The A to Z of the French Revolution (2013)
 Hanson, Paul R. Historical dictionary of the French Revolution (2015) online
 ; inspiration for Soboul and Lefebvre, one of the most important accounts of the Revolution in terms of shaping perspectives;
 Jones, Colin. The Longman Companion to the French Revolution (1989)
 Jones, Colin. The Great Nation: France from Louis XV to Napoleon (2002) excerpt and text search
 
 Madelin, Louis. The French Revolution (1916); textbook by leading French scholar. online
 Paxton, John. Companion to the French Revolution (1987), 234 pp; hundreds of short entries.
 Popkin, Jeremy D. A Short History of the French Revolution (5th ed. 2009) 176 pp
 
 Scott, Samuel F. and Barry Rothaus, eds. Historical Dictionary of the French Revolution, 1789–1799 (2 vol 1984), short essays by scholars vol. 1 online; vol 2 online
 Sutherland, D.M.G. France 1789–1815. Revolution and Counter-Revolution (2nd ed. 2003, 430 pp excerpts and online search from Amazon.com

European and Atlantic History 
 Amann, Peter H., ed. The eighteenth-century revolution: French or Western? (Heath, 1963) readings from historians
 Brinton, Crane. A Decade of Revolution 1789–1799 (1934) the Revolution in European context
 Desan, Suzanne, et al. eds. The French Revolution in Global Perspective (2013)
 Fremont-Barnes, Gregory. ed. The Encyclopedia of the French Revolutionary and Napoleonic Wars: A Political, Social, and Military History (ABC-CLIO: 3 vol 2006)
 Goodwin, A., ed.  The New Cambridge Modern History, Vol. 8: The American and French Revolutions, 1763–93 (1965), 764 pp
 Palmer, R.R. "The World Revolution of the West: 1763–1801," Political Science Quarterly (1954) 69#1 pp. 1–14 
 Palmer, Robert R. The Age of the Democratic Revolution: A Political History of Europe and America, 1760–1800. (2 vol 1959), highly influential comparative history; vol 1 online
 Rude, George F. and Harvey J. Kaye. Revolutionary Europe, 1783–1815 (2000), scholarly survey excerpt and text search

Politics and wars 
 Andress, David. The terror: Civil war in the French revolution (2006).
 ed. Baker, Keith M. The French Revolution and the Creation of Modern Political Culture (Oxford, 1987–94) vol 1: The Political Culture of the Old Regime, ed. K.M. Baker (1987); vol. 2: The Political Culture of the French Revolution, ed. C. Lucas (1988); vol. 3: The Transformation of Political Culture, 1789–1848, eds. F. Furet & M. Ozouf (1989); vol. 4: The Terror, ed. K.M. Baker (1994). excerpt and text search vol 4
 Blanning, T.C.W. The French Revolutionary Wars 1787–1802 (1996).
 Desan, Suzanne. "Internationalizing the French Revolution," French Politics, Culture & Society (2011) 29#2 pp. 137–60.
 Doyle, William. Origins of the French Revolution (3rd ed. 1999) online edition
 Englund, Steven. Napoleon: A Political Life. (2004). 575 pp; emphasis on politics excerpt and text search
 Fremont-Barnes, Gregory. The French Revolutionary Wars (2013), 96 pp; excerpt and text search
 Griffith, Paddy. The Art of War of Revolutionary France 1789–1802, (1998); 304 pp; excerpt and text search
 Hardman, John. Louis XVI: The Silent King (2nd ed. 2016) 500 pp; much expanded new edition; now the standard scholarly biography; (1st ed. 1994) 224; older scholarly biography
 Schroeder, Paul. The Transformation of European Politics, 1763–1848. 1996; Thorough coverage of diplomatic history; hostile to Napoleon; online edition

Economy and society 
 Anderson, James Maxwell. Daily life during the French Revolution (2007)
 Andress, David. French Society in Revolution, 1789–1799 (1999)
 Kennedy, Emmet. A Cultural History of the French Revolution (1989)
 McPhee, Peter. "The French Revolution, Peasants, and Capitalism," American Historical Review (1989) 94#5 pp. 1265–80 
 Tackett, Timothy, "The French Revolution and religion to 1794," and Suzanne Desan, "The French Revolution and religion, 1795–1815," in Stewart J. Brown and Timothy Tackett, eds. The Cambridge History of Christianity vol. 7 (Cambridge UP, 2006).

Women 
 Dalton, Susan. "Gender and the Shifting Ground of Revolutionary Politics: The Case of Madame Roland." Canadian journal of history (2001) 36#2
 Godineau, Dominique. The Women of Paris and Their French Revolution (1998) 440 pp 1998
 Hufton, Olwen. "Women in Revolution 1789–1796" Past & Present (1971) No. 53 pp. 90–108 
 
 Kelly, Linda. Women of the French Revolution (1987) 192 pp. biographical portraits or prominent writers and activists
 Landes, Joan B. Women and the Public Sphere in the Age of the French Revolution (Cornell University Press, 1988) excerpt and text search
 Melzer, Sara E., and Leslie W. Rabine, eds. Rebel daughters: women and the French Revolution (Oxford University Press, 1992)
 Proctor, Candice E. Women, Equality, and the French Revolution (Greenwood Press, 1990) online
 Roessler, Shirley Elson. Out of the Shadows: Women and Politics in the French Revolution, 1789–95 (Peter Lang, 1998) online

Historiography and memory 

 Andress, David. "Interpreting the French Revolution," Teaching History (2013), Issue 150, pp. 28–29, very short summary
 Censer, Jack R. "Amalgamating the Social in the French Revolution." Journal of Social History 2003 37(1): 145–50. online
 Cox, Marvin R. The Place of the French Revolution in History (1997) 288 pp
 Desan, Suzanne. "What's after Political Culture? Recent French Revolutionary Historiography," French Historical Studies (2000) 23#1 pp. 163–96.
 Furet, François and Mona Ozouf, eds. A Critical Dictionary of the French Revolution (1989), 1120 pp; long essays by scholars; strong on history of ideas and historiography (esp pp. 881–1034 excerpt and text search
 Furet, François. Interpreting the French revolution (1981).
 Germani, Ian, and Robin Swayles. Symbols, myths and images of the French Revolution. University of Regina Publications. 1998. 
 Geyl, Pieter. Napoleon for and Against (1949), 477 pp; summarizes views of major historians on controversial issues
 Hanson, Paul R. Contesting the French Revolution (2009). 248 pp.
 Kafker, Frank A. and James M. Laux, eds. The French Revolution: Conflicting Interpretations (5th ed. 2002), articles by scholars
 Kaplan, Steven Laurence. Farewell, Revolution: The Historians' Feud, France, 1789/1989 (1996), focus on historians excerpt and text search
 Kaplan, Steven Laurence. Farewell, Revolution: Disputed Legacies, France, 1789/1989 (1995); focus on bitter debates re 200th anniversary excerpt and text search
 Kates, Gary, ed. The French Revolution: Recent Debates and New Controversies (2nd ed. 2005) excerpt and text search
 Landes, Joan B. 1991. “More than Words: The Printing Press and the French Revolution.” Eighteenth-Century Studies 25: 85–98.
 Lewis, Gwynne. The French Revolution: Rethinking the Debate (1993) online; 142 pp.
 ; 540 pp; 30 essays by experts; emphasis on historiography and memory
 Reichardt, Rolf: The French Revolution as a European Media Event, European History Online, Mainz: Institute of European History, 2010, retrieved: 17 December 2012.
 Ross, Steven T., ed. The French Revolution: conflict or continuity? (1971) 131 pp; excerpt from historians table of contents

Primary sources 

 , complete text online
 
 Dwyer, Philip G. and Peter McPhee, eds.  The French Revolution and Napoleon: A Sourcebook (2002) 235 pp; online
 Legg, L.G. Wickham, ed. Select Documents Illustrative of the History of the French Revolution (2 Volumes, 1905) 630 pp vol 1 online free; in French (not translated)
 Levy, Darline Gay, et al. eds. Women in Revolutionary Paris, 1789–1795 (1981) 244 pp excerpt and text search
 Mason, Laura, and Tracey Rizzo, eds. The French Revolution: A Document Collection (1998) 334 pp excerpt and text search
 Stewart, John Hall, ed. A Documentary Survey of the French Revolution (1951), 818 pp
 Thompson, J.M., ed. The French revolution: Documents, 1789–94 (1948), 287 pp

External links 

 Museum of the French Revolution (French)
 Primary source documents from The Internet Modern History Sourcebook.
 Liberty, Equality, Fraternity: Exploring the French Revolution, a collaborative site by the Center for History and New Media (George Mason University) and the American Social History Project (City University of New York).
 Vancea, S. The Cahiers de Doleances of 1789, Clio History Journal, 2008.
 French Revolution Digital Archive a collaboration of the Stanford University Libraries and the Bibliothèque nationale de France, containing 12000 digitised images
 The guillotined of the French Revolution factsheets of all the sentenced to death of the French Revolution
 Jean-Baptiste Lingaud papers, Kislak Center for Special Collections, Rare Books and Manuscripts, University of Pennsylvania. Includes a vast number of name lists and secret surveillance records as well as arrest warrants for aristocrats and their sympathisers. Most notable in this part of the collection are letters and documents from the Revolutionary Committee and the Surveillance Committee.
 French Revolution Pamphlets, Division of Special Collections, University of Alabama Libraries. Over 300 digitised pamphlets, from writers including Robespierre, St. Juste, Desmoulins, and Danton.
 "The French Revolution's Legacy" BBC Radio 4 discussion with Stefan Collini, Anne Janowitz and Andrew Roberts (In Our Time, 14 June 2001)

 
1789 in France
1790s in France
18th-century rebellions
18th-century revolutions
Conflicts in 1789
Conflicts in 1790
Conflicts in 1791
Conflicts in 1792
Modern history of France
Republicanism in France